Peanut or Peanuts is the nickname of:

 Chiang Kai-shek (1887–1975), derisively called "Peanut" by U.S. Army General Joseph Stilwell
 Nick "Peanut" Baines (born 1978), English rock keyboardist
 Jim Davenport (1933–2016), American Major League Baseball player and coach
 Peanut Louie Harper (born 1960), American retired tennis player
 Peanuts Holland (1910–1979), American jazz trumpeter
 Peanuts Hucko (1918–2003), American jazz clarinetist
 Mamie Johnson (1935–2017), American baseball player, first female pitcher in the Negro leagues
 Erv Kantlehner (1892–1990), American Major League Baseball pitcher nicknamed "Peanuts"
 Paul Lehner (1920–1967), American Major League Baseball player, nicknamed "Peanuts"
 Peanuts Lowrey (1917–1986), American Major League Baseball player
 Peanuts O'Flaherty (1918–2008), Canadian National Hockey League player
 Ed Pinnance (1879–1944), Canadian Major League Baseball pitcher in 1903, nicknamed "Peanuts"
 Charles Tillman (born 1981), American National Football League player
 Dominee Peanut (born 1959), South African teacher

Lists of people by nickname